The Banate of Severin or Banate of Szörény was a Hungarian political, military and administrative unit with a special role in the initially anti-Bulgarian, latterly anti-Ottoman defensive system of the medieval Kingdom of Hungary. It was founded by Prince Béla in 1228.

Territory 
The Banate of Severin was a march (or a border province) of the medieval Kingdom of Hungary between the Lower Danube and the Olt River (in present-day Oltenia in Romania). A charter of grant, issued on 2 June 1247 to the Knights Hospitallers, mentioned the Olt as its eastern border. The Knights received the "Land of Severin" (Terra de Zeurino), along with the nearby mountains, from Béla IV of Hungary. The king had described the same region as a "deserted and depopulated" land in a letter to Pope Gregory IX on 7 June 1238. Modern scholars assume that either the Hungarian conquest of the territory or confrontations between Bulgaria and Hungary had forced the local population to flee. Historian László Makkai says, the population obviously began to increase by the end of the 1230s, because Béla requested the pope to appoint a bishop for Severin.

The 1247 charter of grant also mentioned that "Cumania" bordered the Land of Severin from the east. The same diploma listed two Vlach (or Romanian) political units—the kenezatus of John and Farcaș—which were subjected to the Hospitallers on this occasion. A third kenezatus, which was ruled by Voivode Litovoi, was not included in the grant, but it was left to the Vlachs "as they had held it". However, Béla gave the Hospitallers the half of the royal revenues collected in Litovoi's land, with the exception of the revenues from the "Land of Hátszeg" (now Țara Hațegului in Romania). Alexandru Madgearu says, the diploma shows that Litovoi's kenezatus bordered the Land of Severin to the north, thus the banate must have only included southern Oltenia in the middle of the 13th century. The kenezatus of Voivode Seneslau, which was located to the east of the Olt, was fully excluded from the grant.

The bans initially had their seat at the fortress of Szörény (now Drobeta-Turnu Severin in Romania). After Szörény was lost in the late 13th century, the fort of Miháld (now Mehadia in Romania) was the center of the province. In addition to Miháld, the banate included Orsova (now Orșova in Romania) and the Romanian districts along the upper course of the Temes (Timiș) river.

History 
Kaloyan of Bulgaria occupied the region between the rivers Cerna and the Olt around 1199. The Kingdom of Hungary was also expanding southwards over the Carpathian Mountains in the early 13th century, which gave rise to conflicts between the two countries. The Cuman tribes dwelling to the east of the Olt as far as the river Siret agreed to pay a yearly tribute to the kings of Hungary in early 1227. The Hungarians captured the Bulgarian fortress of Severin during a military campaign against Bulgaria in 1231.

In 1330 the Banate was roughly conquered by Basarab the First, and most of it remained in the jurisdiction of Wallachia for the next centuries. 

After the 1526 Battle of Mohács, the Banate of Severin was divided. South-eastern part (eastwards from Varcsaró - Vârciorova, today part of Bolvașnița) came under the jurisdiction of Wallachian princes and in the north-western part (westwards from Orsova - present-day Orșova - inclusive) was gradually reorganized into the Banate of Lugos and Karánsebes.

Bans of Severin

List of bans

Thirteenth century

Fourteenth century 

1299–1307 András Tárnok
1308–1313 András Tárnok and Márton Tárnok
1314–1318 Domokos Csornai
1319–1323 László Rátholti
1323–1329 Dénes Szécsi
1324 Pál
1330–1341 Dénes Szécsi
1342–1349 István Losonci
1350–1355 Miklós Szécsi
1355–1359 Dénes Lackfi
1359–1375 vacant
1376 János Treutel
1376–1387 vacant
1387 László Losonci Jr.
1387–1388 István Losonci
1388–1390 János Kaplai-Serkei
1390–1391 Miklós Perényi
1392 Szemere Gerebenci
1392–1393 Bebek Detre
1393 Frank Szécsi
1393–1397 vacant
1397 Lukács of Oszkola
1393–1408 vacant
1408–1409 Pipo of Ozora
1409 vacant
1410 Lőrinc, son of Majos
1410–1428 vacant
1428 Imre Marcali
1430–1435 Miklós Redwitz
1429–1435 vacant
1435 László Hagymás of Beregszó and János Dancs of Macedonia
1436–1439 Franko Talovac
1439–1446 John Hunyadi, Ban of Severin
1445–1446 Miklós Újlaki
1447–1454 Mihály Csornai
1449 Balázs Csornai
1452–1454 Péter Dancs of Sebes
1455-57 vacant
1458 Vlad and Gergely Bethlen
1459–1460 vacant
1460 László Dóczi
1462–1463 Nicholas of Ilok
1464–1466 vacant
1466 János Pongrácz of Dengeleg
1467 vacant
1467 István and Mihály de Muthnoki
1468–1471 vacant
1471–1478 Imre Hédervári
1478 János Erdő and Domokos Bethlen
1478 vacant
1479 Ambrus Török and György Szenthelsebethi
1479 Bertalan Pathócsy
1480–1483 Bertalan Pathócsy and Ferenc Haraszti
1483–1489 Ferenc Haraszti and András Szokoly
1490 Imre Ozorai
1491 Imre Ozorai and Dánfy András of Doboz
1491–1492 Ferenc Haraszti and Dánfy András of Doboz
1492 Móré Fülöp Csulai
1492–1494 Móré György Csulai and Ferenc Balassa 
1495–1501 Tárnok Péter Macskási and Jakab Gerlisthey
1501 Jakab Gerlisthey and Bélai Barnabás
1502 Jakab Gerlisthey and Tárnok Péter Macskási
1503 Bélai Barnabás
1503 Jakab Gerlisthey
1504–1508 Jakab Gerlisthey and Barnabás Bélai
1508–1513 Mihály Paksi and Barnabás Bélai
1514 Barnabás Bélai and János Szapolyai
1515–1516 Miklós Hagymási of Berekszó
1517–1518 vacant
1519 Bélai Barnabás
1520–1521 Miklós Gerlisthey
1522–1523 János Vitéz Kállay
1524–1526 János Vitéz Kállay and János Szapolyai
1526–1540 Under the rule of Lugos and Karánsebes Bans
1526–1860 Under Ottoman occupation

See also 
 Banat of Craiova

References

Bibliography

Further reading 
Hațegan I., Cavalerii teutoni în Banatul Severinului (1429–1435), "Tibiscus-istorie" V, Muzeul Banatului, Timișoara, 1978, pp. 191–196.
http://mek.niif.hu/02100/02114/html/316.html Histoire de la Transylvanie

External links 
Map

Banates of the Kingdom of Hungary
Medieval Romania
History of Banat
Territorial evolution of Hungary
Oltenia